South Miami Heights is a census-designated place (CDP), originally known as Eureka, in Miami-Dade County, within the U.S. state of Florida. The population was 36,770 as of the 2020 census.

Geography
It is bordered to the east by Cutler Bay, to the south by Goulds, to the northwest by Richmond West, and to the northeast by West Perrine. It is bordered to the north by Thompson Memorial Park and Zoo Miami.

Demographics

2020 census

As of the 2020 United States census, there were 36,770 people, 10,589 households, and 8,319 families residing in the CDP.

2010 census
As of the census in 2010, there were 35,696 people, 10,706 households, and 8,358 families living in the CDP. The racial makeup of the CDP was 67.2% White (11.2% Non-Hispanic White,) 24.3% African American, 0.28% Native American, 1.5% Asian, 0.02% Pacific Islander, 6.85% from other races, and 5.23% from two or more races. Hispanic or Latino of any race were 68.0% of the population.

There were 10,706 households, out of which 55.3% had children under the age of 18 living with them, 52.4% were married couples living together. Hispanic or Latino of any race were 68.0% of the population. The average household size was 3.30 and the average family size was 3.63.

In the CDP, the population was spread out, with 27.6% under the age of 19, 14.0% from 20 to 29, 12.8% from 30 to 39, 32.6% from 40 to 64, and 12.9% who were 65 years of age or older. The median age was 37 years. For every 100 females, there were 93.3 males. For every 100 females age 18 and over, there were 88.4 males.

The median income for a family in the CDP was $45,334. Males had a median income of $32,054 versus $27,254 for females. The per capita income for the CDP was $16,229. About 18.5% of families and 18.9% of the population were below the poverty line, including 27.0% of those under age 18 and 26.2% of those age 65 or over.

As of 2010, speakers of Spanish as a first language accounted for 46.0% of residents, while English made up 35.7%, French was at 0.94%, and French Creole was the mother tongue of 0.81% of the population.

References

Census-designated places in Miami-Dade County, Florida
Census-designated places in Florida